The Israeli Security Service Law, also known as the Israeli Defense Service Law, regulates conscription into military service for citizens of Israel. The Security Service Law replaced the Security Service Act of 1949, which made conscription a national routine rather than only requiring military draft during national security emergencies.

History

Following the devastation of Europe's Jewish population during the Nazi Holocaust and coupled with the rise in Zionism since the 19th century, the United Nations General Assembly recommended the establishment of a Jewish state in the Middle Eastern province of Palestine. Following the declaration of its independence on 14 May 1948, the Arab nations of Egypt, Syria, Jordan, and Iraq began to invade Palestine in an attempt to eradicate the newly formed state of Israel. On 26 May 1948, the Israeli Defense Force, or IDF, was established as Israel's official military. Formed out of the pre-1948 Jewish paramilitary organizations Haganah, Irgun and Lehi, the IDF was a conscription military divided into the army, navy, and air force branches. Immediately, the IDF drafted thousands of men into service to combat the invading Arab forces. The Security Service Act and later Security Service Law was passed in 1949 to regulate the recruitment into IDF service. The law has since gone through several revisions and alterations, most notably in 1959 and 1986.

The Law

Age

The Security Service Law requires that all citizens of Israel, except those who qualify for the exemptions from service, to service in the various branches of the IDF. Section 2 defines the age appropriate for conscription, and set it at 18–29 years of age for men, and 18–26 for women, based on the Hebrew calendar. However, recruitment may begin at age 17 if the parents or guardians of the recruit allow it.

Pre-service screening

Section 3 through 12 gives the Israeli Secretary of Defense the authority to call citizens to medical screenings to determine if conscription is permissible.

Duration of service

Service for men is set at 36 months, however, recruits over the age of 27 are only required to serve for 24 months. Immigrants who arrive in Israel at the age of 27+ years are only required 18 months of service. (Article 15)

Service for women is set at 24 months, yet women may volunteer for an additional 12 months under section 16a.  (Article 16)

Any soldier tried and found guilty by a military court or deserters who are returned to service are to have their service time extended to meet the requirements of regular service duty under Article 18.

Non-military positions

The Security Service Law extends to cover conscription into the Israeli Border Police, or Magav, under Article 24.

Since 1995, section 24A regulated the transfer of soldiers into the Israeli Police Service, or Shaham.

In 2005, Section 24 regulated the use of IDF troops as Israeli prison guards.

Exemptions from service

Power is given to the Israeli Defense Minister to exempt citizens from service under Section 36.

Section 36A states that for regular service in the IDF, the age of the soldier shall not exceed 54 for men and 38 for women.

Section 39 exempts pregnant women and current mothers from service, also married women are exempt from regular service but not reserve service.

Article 40 provides the layout for what the military allows for religious exemption from service. However, this is the only exemption that may be enacted and revoked at any time by the Israeli Ministry of Defense.

Male Druzes are eligible for conscription into the IDF under the Israeli Security Service Law; however, a growing controversy is the exclusion of recruiting Muslim Israeli Arabs into service. This exemption originated in 1949 and was again continued after review in 1954 and has yet to be revoked.

Tal Law and Plesner Committee
With growing concern over the increasing populations of yeshiva students and Arab-Israelis being exempt from IDF service, the Tal Committee was formed in 1999 to discuss and attempt to find a solution as to how to induct these members of society into the military or National Services. It was noted that at the time there were potentially 30,414 Israeli ultra-Orthodox men who were exempt but capable of entering the military. The Tal Law developed from this committee and was passed on 23 July 2002. It called for 80 percent of yeshiva students to begin the process of entering into the services. Renewal of the law was placed in 5-year increments. However, it was met with great protest from yeshiva and political members for its entirety. In 2012 the Israeli High Court determined that the law was unconstitutional. Following the courts decision, the Plesner committee was formed to again attempt a new method for inducting these segments of the population into the IDF or national Services. Due to member complications the report was left in an indeterminate state with goals set for 2016 to begin the inductions for yeshivas and Arabs into the services required.

Punishments
If a person attempts to dodge the draft by providing the state of Israel with false information, false medical recorders, mutilates their body or has someone else mutilate their body to avoid conscription, they may be charged and given 5 years in prison as punishment under Article 46A.

See also
Conscription in Israel
Refusal to serve in the IDF
IDF
Tal Law
Exemption from military service in Israel

References 

http://www.mfa.gov.il/mfa/mfa-archive/1980-1989/pages/defence%20service%20law%20-consolidated%20version--%205746-1.aspx

Conscription in Israel